Oconee Station was established in 1792 as a blockhouse on the South Carolina frontier. Troops were removed in 1799. The site also encompasses the Williams Richards House, which was built in the early 19th century as a residence and trading post.  The site is listed on the National Register of Historic Places in 1971 as Oconee Station and Richards House.

 
There is a short spur trail to Station Cove Falls, which is a  waterfall, and the Oconee Passage of the Palmetto Trail.

The Oconee Station and the William Richards House were photographed by Jack Boucher of the Historic American Buildings Survey in 1960.  Both structures are open for tours on weekends and by appointment.  Admission is free.

References

External links

Photos and more info on Oconee Station

Houses on the National Register of Historic Places in South Carolina
Historic American Buildings Survey in South Carolina
Houses completed in 1760
Protected areas of Oconee County, South Carolina
National Register of Historic Places in Oconee County, South Carolina
South Carolina state historic sites
State parks of the Appalachians
Historic house museums in South Carolina
Museums in Oconee County, South Carolina
Houses in Oconee County, South Carolina